In the context of computer supplies, the word spindle or cakebox may refer to a plastic container for packaging optical discs.  It typically consists of a round base with a vertical rod (which matches the center holes of the disks) and a cylindrical cover made from polypropylene plastic.  Bulk blank CDs, DVDs, and BDs are often sold in such a package.

Dummy discs made of clear polycarbonate without a recording surface are often packed on the ends of the stack to avoid scratches from contact with surrounding things.

See also 

 Optical disc packaging

Packaging
Optical disc authoring